Mykola Petrovych Budnyk was a luthier and traditional performer in the  Kobzar tradition. He was active in authentic construction and recreation of historic folk instruments, and involved in the movement for authentic performаnce practice on Ukrainian folk instruments. Budnyk was also known as a painter and poet. He was born in 1954 in Skolobiv, near Khoroshiv, Zhytomyr region, and died January 16, 2001, in Irpin', Kyiv region.

He was chairman of the Kyiv Kobzar Guild (Kobzarskyi Tsekh), bandura, known as a master player of folk musical instruments, and as an artist and poet.

Creative legacy 
Budnyk recreated 17 types of traditional folk instruments - among them different regional types of the kobza, bandura,   lira, husli, hudok, torban, husli, hudok and other traditional Ukrainian musical instruments. Together Budnyk formally resurrected the Kobzarskyi Tsekh (Kobzar Guild), uniting like-minded intellectuals interested in the study and revival of authentic traditional music of the kobzars.

Budnyk initially studied traditional kobzar performance from Heorhy Tkachenko from 1978, and initially made himself a traditional bandura. He had a natural aptitude to authentic instrument construction and made banduras for many of Tkachenko's students. He later made a number of other authentic Ukrainian folk instruments and also began to teach others how to make and play these instruments in an authentic manner. The Kobzar guild he co-created revived traditional performance practices such as street-performance (busking). Much of the repertoire, such as the para-religious psalms and kants, which were previously suppressed in Soviet times as well as the epic form known as dumy were also reintroduced.And that is very important.

Budnyk authored a textbook on making old-type banduras.

After his death, his recordings were collected and released in the CDa Mykola Budnyk. Hej, na Chornomu mori...  Project "My Ukraine. Bervy". (Hey, at the black sea), by Art-Veles

Teachers 
1980 - began to learn to play the bandura and the traditional kobza legacy with Heorhy Tkachenko with a small group of contemporaries: Volodymyr Kushpet, Victor Mishalow, Mykola Tovkaylo and others. He began producing old-type bandura, kobza and lira using traditional technology and methods. After Tkachenko's death he took the leadership position of this movement.

Students 
Budnyk had many students of the bandura and hurdy-gurdy, including the well-known film producer Oles Sanin, Oleksandr Kit as well as performers Taras Kompanichenko, Taras Sylenko, Ruslan Kozlenko, Pavlo Zubchenko, and Ivan Kushnir.

References

Further reading 
 Diakowsky, M. - A Note on the History of the Bandura. The Annals of the Ukrainian Academy of Arts and Sciences in the U.S. - 4, 3-4 No.1419, N.Y. 1958 - С.21-22
 Mishalow, V. and M. - Ukrains'ki kobzari-bandurysty - Sydney, Australia, 1986
 Haydamaka, L. – Kobza-bandura – National Ukrainian Musical Instrument. "Guitar Review" No.33, Summer 1970 (С.13-18)
 Mishalow, V. - A Brief Description of the Zinkiv Method of Bandura Playing. Bandura, 1982, No.2/6, - С.23-26
 Mishalow, V. - A Short History of the Bandura. East European Meetings in Ethnomusicology 1999, Romanian Society for Ethnomusicology, Volume 6, - С.69-86
 Mizynec, V. - Folk Instruments of Ukraine. Bayda Books, Melbourne, Australia, 1987 - 48с.
 Cherkaskyi, L. - Ukrainski narodni muzychni instrumenty. Tekhnika, Kyiv, Ukraine, 2003 - 262 pages.

External links 
 Kyiv Kobzarskyi Tsekh Website 

 

Ukrainian musicians
Kobzars
Hurdy-gurdy players
1953 births
2001 deaths